Linkiesta is an independent Italian online newspaper of investigative journalism, in-depth analysis and commentary. It was launched on 31 January 2011 and, from 24 September 2019, the editor in chief is Christian Rocca. The first editor in chief was Jacopo Tondelli.

Society 
The Società Editoriale Linkiesta, the publisher, is a start-up comprising journalists and businessmen. It is a public company with about 80 shareholders who have put in an investment between €10,000 and €50,000. The governance rules state that nobody can own more than 5% of the capital stock. Initially, a full list of shareholders was published on the website. "Many shareholders and no bosses", declared the former editor in chief Jacopo Tondelli in a video interview published on Il Sole 24 ORE. "As we are a public company, nobody can exert individual influence on the editorial line", he added.

References

2011 establishments in Italy
Italian-language newspapers
Italian-language websites
Daily newspapers published in Italy
Publications established in 2011